Limestone Cove is an unincorporated community in Unicoi County, Tennessee. It is located at and around the junction of Tennessee State Routes 107 and 173.

Recreation
The Cherokee National Forest's Limestone Cove Recreation Area is located in Limestone Cove.

References

Unincorporated communities in Unicoi County, Tennessee
Unincorporated communities in Tennessee